Eve's Leaves is a 1926 American silent romantic comedy film starring Leatrice Joy and William Boyd. The film was produced and distributed by Cecil B. DeMille and directed by Paul Sloane It is based upon the 1925 play of the same name by Harry Chapman Ford.

Plot
Captain Corbin (Edeson), who operates the tramp cargo ship Garden of Eden, has raised his daughter Eve (Joy) as a boy. After learning about men after reading some romance novels belonging to the cook Cookie (Harris), she goes ashore in a Chinese port to find her true love and spies American Bob Britton (Boyd), whom she then has kidnapped to augment the ship's crew. Pirate Chang Fang (Long) and his pirates capture the ship seeking passage to his stronghold. With Cookie's help, Eve remakes herself using an outfit made from a curtain and some beads, which draws the interest of both Chang and Bob. In the end, Eve saves the day and she and Bob are married on board by a missionary (Hoyt).

Cast

Production
Leatrice Joy had impulsively cut her hair short in 1926, and DeMille, whom Joy had followed when he set up Producers Distributing Corporation, was publicly angry as it prevented her from portraying traditional feminine roles. The studio developed projects with roles suitable for her “Leatrice Joy bob”, and Eve's Leaves was the second of five films before she regrew her hair. In both Eve's Leaves and The Clinging Vine (1926), Joy's character is mistaken as being male in at least one scene. In 1928, a professional dispute would end the Joy / Demille partnership and she signed with MGM.

Intertitles featuring quotes from stereotype Chinese characters are in a racist fictional Asian dialect that today would be considered offensive.

Preservation
A 16mm print of Eve's Leaves is preserved film at the UCLA Film and Television Archive and the film has been released on DVD.

References

External links

Stills at moviessilently.com
Lantern slide at worthpoint.com
Theater advertisement at filmaffinity.com

1926 films
American romantic comedy films
American silent feature films
Films based on short fiction
1926 romantic comedy films
American black-and-white films
Producers Distributing Corporation films
Films directed by Paul Sloane
1920s American films
Silent romantic comedy films
Silent American comedy films